Lo-fi or low-fidelity is sound quality lower than usual contemporary standards, as in lo-fi music.

It may also refer to:

 Lo-fi (audio), referring to the more technical aspects of fidelity in audio
 Lo-Fi (band), an American country music band
 Lo-fi photography, photographic practices giving an impression of low quality
 Lofi hip hop, a downtempo genre
 "Lo-Fi", an episode of Criminal Minds (season 3)
 Lofi (loop file interface), a Unix loop device
 Lofi Girl, YouTube channel formerly known as ChilledCow
 Lo-Fi Girl, an animated character for the YouTube channel

See also

Chill-out music, characterized by slow tempos and relaxed moods
 List of lo-fi musicians